Understand Me is the debut EP by American hip hop recording artist Problem, released on December 10, 2013 under Diamond Lane Music Group.  The EP follows up six months after the release of his ninth mixtape, The Separation. The eight-track project is a collection of new and previously released material, including "Like Whaaat," "Say That Then" and the title track. The EP features production from League of Starz, Mars (of production group 1500 or Nothin'), P-Lo of The Invasion, Yung JR and Iamsu. Guest appearances on the EP came from Glasses Malone, Bad Lucc (of Dubb Union) and Mars.

For promotional purposes, Diamond Lane Music Group published a trailer on YouTube on November 21, 2013. On December 6, 2013, Problem finalized a Californian tour in support of his The Separation mixtape and the EP. On that same date, Understand Me, was made available to stream via the West Coast rapper's MySpace page. On December 8, 2013, the title track's Taj TPK and Austin Kelley-directed visual was published on YouTube.

Track listing

Chart positions

References

2013 debut EPs
Hip hop EPs
Albums produced by Mars (record producer)